Mongla is an upazila of Bagerhat District in the Division of Khulna, Bangladesh.

Geography
It has 27192 households and total area 1461.22 km2.

Mongla Upazila borders Rampal Upazila on the north, the Bay of Bengal on the south, Morrelganj and Sarankhola Upazilas on the east and Dacope Upazila on the west. The main rivers are Pasur and Mongla.

Mongla (Town) stands on the river Pashur. It is the second biggest seaport of the country. The area of the town is 17.79 km2.

The port of Mongla 

There is a link sea port of Khulna city.It is the 2nd largest and 2nd busiest sea port in Bangladesh.It is situated close to the shore of Bay of bengal and Pashur river.

Demographics
According to the 1991 Bangladesh census, Mongla had a population of 137,947. Males constituted 54.73% of the population, and females 45.27%. The population aged 18 or over was 77,995. Mongla had an average literacy rate of 42.8% (7+ years), compared to the national average of 32.4% literate.

Mongla municipality was established in 1991. The town has a population of 60561; male 57.27%, female 42.73%. The density of population is 2943 per km2. The literacy rate among the town's people is 53.6%. The town has one dakbungalow.

71.31% of the population are Muslim, 24.95% Hindu 3.74% follow other beliefs.

Administration
Mongla thana was established in 1976 and was turned into an upazila in 1983.

Mongla Upazila is divided into Mongla Municipality and six union parishads: Burirdanga, Chandpi, Chila, Mithakhali, Suniltala, and Sundarban. The union parishads are subdivided into 32 mauzas and 76 villages.

Mongla Municipality is subdivided into 9 wards and 13 mahallas.

Education 
The literacy rate is 42.80%, comprising 49.6% among males, and 34.2% among females. The educational institutions comprise four colleges, 20 high schools, a junior school, 32 government primary schools, 29 non-government primary schools, five satellite schools and 18 madrasas, the most noted of which is St Pauls High School. It was established in 1954 by Italian missionaries. After that, Freedom Fighter Father Marino Rigon dedicated his whole career for this, and he was laid to rest in Mongla too.

According to Banglapedia, Mongla Bandar Secondary School, founded in 1987, is a notable secondary school.
Burirdanga Secondary School.
Village +Post-Burirdanga, Upazila-Mongla, District -Bagerhat.
Established on 01/01/1963.

Media
The newspapers and periodicals are the Daily Sundarban and weekly Mongla.

References

External links 
 Monglaport : Official Site
 Bagerhat District

 
Upazilas of Bagerhat District